The 1945 Latvian Higher League was a season of the Latvian Higher League, the top-level football league in Latvia. It was contested by six teams, with Dinamo Rīga winning the championship.

League standings

References
RSSSF

Latvian SSR Higher League
Football
Latvia